The Canadian Stakes is a Grade II Thoroughbred horse race run annually at Woodbine Racetrack in Toronto, Ontario, Canada. Run in mid September, it is a Grade II event open to fillies and mares, three years of age and older. It is raced on turf over a distance of "about"  miles.

Known as the Canadian Handicap until 2006, it was inaugurated at the now defunct Greenwood Raceway in 1955 as a  mile race on dirt and was open to horses of either sex, aged three and older. In 1964, the event was transferred to Woodbine Racetrack where in 1970 it became a race on the grass for fillies and mares only.

In 1996, the race was run on dirt and was split into two divisions in 1982 through 1985 and again in 1989.

Records
Most wins:
 2 - Classic Stamp (2004, 2005)
 2 - Starship Jubilee (2018, 2019)

Most wins by an owner:
 5 - Sam-Son Farm (1989, 1991, 1998, 2014, 2020)

Most wins by a jockey:
 5 - Robin Platts (1975, 1982, 1983, 1984, 1986)

Most wins by a trainer:
 2 - Ted Mann (1965, 1977)
 2 - J. Mort Hardy (1968, 1983)
 2 - Donnie Walker (1970, 1985)
 2 - David C. Brown (1978, 1993)
 2 - Yonnie Starr (1980, 1981)
 2 - Michael J. Doyle (1984, 1986)
 2 - Roger Attfield (1984, 1994)
 2 - James E. Day (1989, 1991)
 2 - David R. Bell (1990, 1997)
 2 - Todd Pletcher (2006, 2008)
 2 - Michael R. Matz (2009, 2013)
 2 - Barbara J. Minshall (1995, 2015)
 2 - Kevin Attard (2018, 2019)
 2 - Christophe Clement (2002, 2021)

Winners of the Canadian Stakes

See also
 List of Canadian flat horse races

References

 The Canadian Stakes at Pedigree Query

Graded stakes races in Canada
Turf races in Canada
Mile category horse races for fillies and mares
Woodbine Racetrack
Recurring sporting events established in 1955
Breeders' Cup Challenge series
1955 establishments in Ontario